This word explains the characteristics related to the Indian city Pune. Puneri word is referred in following areas.

 Puneri Pagadi - It is a turban, which is considered as a symbol of pride and honour in the town of Pune( Maharashtra) .
 Puneri Misal, a kind of Misal (food) or a show on Saam TV

Culture of Pune

 it is also called to the local people of Pune